The 2021–22 Greek Football Cup was the 80th edition of the Greek Football Cup. The winner of the Cup will qualify for the next season's Europa Conference League third qualifying round.

Calendar

Source:

Qualifying rounds

First round
The draw took place on 12 August 2021.

Summary

|colspan="3" style="background-color:#D0D0D0" align=center|28 August 2021

|-
|colspan="3" style="background-color:#D0D0D0" align=center|29 August 2021

|-
|colspan="3" style="background-color:#D0D0D0" align=center|5 September 2021

|-
|colspan="3" style="background-color:#D0D0D0" align=center|N/A

|}

Matches

Second round
The draw took place on 6 September 2021.

Summary

|colspan="3" style="background-color:#D0D0D0" align=center|11 September 2021

|-
|colspan="3" style="background-color:#D0D0D0" align=center|12 September 2021

|}

Matches

Third round
The draw took place on 21 September 2021.

Summary

|colspan="3" style="background-color:#D0D0D0" align=center|25 September 2021

|-
|colspan="3" style="background-color:#D0D0D0" align=center|26 September 2021

|-
|colspan="3" style="background-color:#D0D0D0" align=center|29 September 2021

|}

Matches

Fourth round
The draw took place on 30 September 2021.

Summary

|colspan="3" style="background-color:#D0D0D0" align=center|6 October 2021

|-
|colspan="3" style="background-color:#D0D0D0" align=center|N/A

|}

Matches

Fifth round
The draw took place on 14 October 2021.

Summary

|colspan="3" style="background-color:#D0D0D0" align=center|26 October 2021

|-
|colspan="3" style="background-color:#D0D0D0" align=center|27 October 2021

|-
|colspan="3" style="background-color:#D0D0D0" align=center|28 October 2021

|-
|colspan="3" style="background-color:#D0D0D0" align=center|3 November 2021

|}

Matches

Knockout phase
Each tie in the knockout phase, apart from the quarter-finals and the semi-finals, was played by a single match. If the score was level at the end of normal time, extra time was played, followed by a penalty shoot-out if the score was still level. In the quarter-finals and the semi-finals were played over two legs, with each team playing one leg at home. The team that scored more goals on aggregate over the two legs advanced to the next round. If the aggregate score was level, the away goals rule was applied, i.e. the team that scored more goals away from home over the two legs advanced. If away goals were also equal, then extra time was played. The away goals rule was again applied after extra time, i.e. if there were goals scored during extra time and the aggregate score was still level, the visiting team advanced by virtue of more away goals scored. If no goals were scored during extra time, the winners were decided by a penalty shoot-out. In the round of 16, if the score was level at the end of normal time the two-legged rule was applied.The mechanism of the draws for each round is as follows:
In the draw for the Round of 16, the four Super League clubs finishing in places 1–4 in the previous season are seeded, while the clubs advancing from the Fifth Round are unseeded.The seeded teams are drawn against the unseeded teams, with the seeded teams hosting the second leg. The remaining 8 unseeded clubs will be drawn against one another with the team being drawn last hosting the second leg.
In the draws for the quarter-finals onwards, there are no seedings and teams from the same group can be drawn against each other.

Bracket

Round of 16
The draw took place on 18 November 2021. The first legs were played on 1 December 2021 and the second legs were played on 22 and 23 December 2021.

Summary

|}

Matches

PAOK won 4–2 on aggregate.

Aris won 5–1 on aggregate.

AEK Athens won 5–1 on aggregate.

Olympiacos won 4–3 on aggregate.

Panathinaikos won 2–1 on aggregate.

Anagennisi Karditsa won 6–0 on aggregate.

Lamia won 3–0 on aggregate.

Panetolikos won 3–0 on aggregate.

Quarter-finals

The draw took place on 29 December 2021. Former Greek international and member of the UEFA Euro 2004 squad, Kostas Katsouranis, made the draw using a manually operated lottery ball cage.

Summary

|}

Matches

Lamia won 1–0 on aggregate.

Olympiacos won 4–3 on aggregate.

Panathinaikos won 5–0 on aggregate.

PAOK won 2–1 on aggregate.

Semi-finals

The draw took place on 29 December 2021, after the quarter-final draw.

Summary

|}

Matches

Panathinaikos won 3–0 on aggregate

1–1 on aggregate; PAOK won on away goals

Final

References

External links
Match Program 
Soccerway 

Cup
Greek Football Cup seasons
Greece